Edward Griffin Parker (November 16, 1825 – March 30. 1868) was a United States lawyer, editor and author.

He entered College from Boston, where he was born, and graduated from Yale College in 1847.  On graduating studied law in the office of the Hon. Rufus Choate. Being admitted to the bar in 1849, he commenced practice in the same city, where he continued until the war. He was prominent in state politics, and a member of both houses of the Massachusetts Legislature. During his residence in Massachusetts, he published The Golden Age of American Oratory  (Boston, 1857), and  Reminiscences of Rufus Choate (N. Y, 1860). He was also a contributor to some of the leading literary journals. On the breaking out of the American Civil War, Col. Parker (having acquired his title from his position on the staff of Gov. Nathaniel P. Banks) entered the service as captain on Gen. Butler's staff. Later he was adjutant general and chief of staff of Gen. Martindale during the time that the latter commanded the Department of Washington. At the close of the war he settled in New York, and went into business in Wall St. Not being particularly successful, he took charge of the American Literary Bureau of Reference, and was thus engaged at the time of his death, at the Everett House in New York City, March 30, 1868, aged 42 years.  He left a wife.

Works
“The Golden Age of American Oratory” (Boston, 1857)
“Reminiscences of Rufus Choate” (New York, 1860)

References

1825 births
1868 deaths
Lawyers from Boston
American editors
19th-century American lawyers
Lawyers from New York City
American male writers
Members of the Massachusetts House of Representatives
Massachusetts state senators
Yale College alumni
Union Army officers
19th-century American politicians
Politicians from New York City